This article provides two lists:
A list of National Basketball Association (NBA) players by total career playoff assists recorded.
A progressive list of assist leaders showing how the record increased through the years.

Playoff assist leaders
This is a list of National Basketball Association players by total career playoff assists recorded.

Statistics accurate as of the 2022 NBA playoffs.

Progressive list of playoff assist leaders

This is a progressive list of assist leaders showing how the record increased through the years.

Statistics accurate as of the 2022 NBA playoffs.''

See also
Basketball statistics
NBA post-season records

References

External links
Basketball-Reference.com enumeration of NBA career playoff leaders in assists

National Basketball Association lists
National Basketball Association statistical leaders